Sister Cities International (SCI) is a nonprofit citizen diplomacy network that creates and strengthens partnerships between communities in the United States and those in other countries, particularly through the establishment of "sister cities"—broad, long-term agreements formally recognized by civic leaders. Its mission is to "build global cooperation at the municipal level, promote cultural understanding and stimulate economic development". A total of 1,800 cities, states, and counties are partnered in 138 countries worldwide. 

As the official organization that links jurisdictions in the U.S. with communities worldwide, Sister Cities International recognizes, registers, and coordinates relationships between cities, counties, provinces, and other subnational political divisions at various levels.

The U.S. sister city program began in 1956 when President Dwight D. Eisenhower proposed a people-to-people, citizen diplomacy initiative. Originally a program of the National League of Cities, Sister Cities International became a separate, nonprofit corporation in 1967, due to the growth and popularity of the U.S. program.

Sister Cities program
The Sister Cities program is designed as means for cultural exchange. A community of any size decides to join with a community in another nation to learn more about one another. Therefore, a sister city, country, oblast, prefecture, province, region, state, territory, town, or village relationship is a broad-based, officially approved, long-term partnership between two communities.

Sister City relationships begin for a variety of reasons. Generally sister city partnerships share similar demographics and town size. Partnerships may arise from business connections, travel, similar industries, diaspora communities, or shared history. For example, Portland, Oregon and Bologna, Italy’s partnership arose from shared industries in biotechnology and education, an appreciation for the arts, and a “similar attitude towards food”,  whereas Chicago’s link with Warsaw, Poland began with the city’s historic Polish community.

Sister Cities International also recognizes "Friendship City" affiliations. These are a less formal arrangement that may be a step towards a full Sister City affiliation. 'Friendship City' is also the Chinese term for 'Sister City'.

Mission and goals
The organization's mission is to "promote peace through mutual respect, understanding, and cooperation — one individual, one community at a time."

Sister Cities International's stated goals are to:
 Develop municipal partnerships between U.S. cities, counties, and states and similar jurisdictions in other nations.
 Provide opportunities for city officials and citizens to experience and explore other cultures through long-term community partnerships.
 Create an atmosphere in which economic and community development can be implemented and strengthened.
 Stimulate environments through which communities will creatively learn, work, and solve problems together through reciprocal cultural, educational, municipal, business, professional and technical exchanges and projects.
 Collaborate with organizations in the United States and other countries which share similar goals.

Programs
Sister Cities International advances their goals by approaching from four broad-based areas: cultural exchange, humanitarian assistance, youth and educational programs, and economic and sustainable development.

Arts and cultural exchange 
Cultural exchanges occur on an individual level from city to city. Sister Cities International facilitates these exchanges by providing support and funding.

According to the Sister Cities International website, these exchanges occur in various ways including: "musical performances, art exhibits, construction of peace parks or tea gardens, international cultural festivals, and teacher exchanges". Well known demonstrations of sister city cultural events include the annual National Cherry Blossom Festival in Washington, D.C. honoring the sister city relationship between Tokyo City and Washington, D.C.

Humanitarian assistance
 Sino-African Initiative: Beginning in February 2012, Sister Cities International launched a 2-year program addressing urban poverty in African cities. SAI is a tri-lateral initiative bringing together U.S., African, and Chinese sister cities, and will be implemented through 3 pilot projects. 
 Safe Drinking Water Initiative: In 2008, Sister Cities International engaged member cities to pilot the Safe Drinking Water Initiative (SDWI). SDWI was created with the goal of distributing approximately 250,000 packets of Procter & Gamble's PUR through sister city networks in Ethiopia and Nigeria, purifying more than 2.5 million liters of water.
September Concert: Sister Cities International partners with The September Concert to sponsor a series of free musical performances held in sister cities around the world on September 11 of every year. The concerts help to bring people of all nations together—reaffirming our hopes for world peace and celebrating our lives and universal humanity. 
Africa Urban Poverty Alleviation Program: In 2009, Sister Cities International launched the Africa Urban Poverty Alleviation Program, a three-year project to alleviate poverty in 25 African cities through water, sanitation and health initiatives led by U.S. and African sister city programs. U.S. sister cities collaborate with their African counterparts to identify and address the most critical problems in these sectors, which form barriers to sustained development in urban areas. In 2021, they are estimating that 9.1 million people are working on projects with drinking water.

Youth and education programs
 Youth Ambassador Program: The youth ambassador program supports the exchange of high school students between Mexico, Canada, and the United States. Students participate in three–week exchanges in both Mexico and the U.S, meeting with NGOs and government officials, and explore issues like poverty and the environment from a local and international perspective.
 Young Artists and Authors Showcases: The Young Artists and Authors Showcases encourages youth ages 13–18 to express their vision of the sister city mission through original works of art and composition.
Sister Schools: The Sister Schools program links youth in collaborative projects through a classroom, school or after-school activity. Students can engage in letter, video, or web cast exchange, leadership-building projects, fund-raising campaigns or projects tailored to their interests.
Student Exchange Partnership: Sister Cities International offers youth exchange opportunities to its members. Through this partnership with American Cultural Exchange Service (ACES), sister city members can nominate and sponsor high school students from their sister city to study in the U.S. for a semester or a school year. The students live with host families and participate in local activities.
 Special Education and Virtual Learning in the U.S. and Palestine (SEVLUP) grant: Sister Cities International oversees two programs through its SEVLUP grant, the Gainesville program and the Muscatine program. The Gainesville program connects students in Florida and Qalqilya, Palestinian Territories in order to develop an ASL-Palestinian sign language video dictionary for Deaf and Hard of Hearing students. The Muscatine program works with sister city Ramallah, Palestinian Territories, to provide special education training for middle school educators and expands intercultural curricula for special education students.

Economic and sustainable development 
Leading Asia: This three-year program aims to strengthen U.S.-Japan ties by increasing opportunity for current partnerships and promoting new U.S.-Japan sister city relationships. Leading Asia will fund the travel of 12 U.S. cities to their Japanese sister city to develop new programs in areas of: “business development, sustainability, creative economies, and young professional development”.
 Innovation in Sustainable Development—Energy Award: With funding from the U.S. Department of Energy, Sister Cities International added an energy category to its Annual Awards program. 
Open World Program: Sister Cities International and World Serves of La Crosse, Inc., partner to administer the Open World Program. Since 2002, U.S. sister city communities have hosted nearly 400 emerging leaders from Russia, Ukraine, Lithuania and Uzbekistan to learn more about accountability, transparency and citizen participation in government. The Open World Program is sponsored by the Open World Center, which is affiliated with the U.S. Library of Congress.
Cyber Sister Cities: Citrix Systems and Sister Cities International partnered in 2006 to pilot the first Cyber Sister City relationship between Agogo, Ghana and Fort Lauderdale, FL. Citrix provided the technological guidance and support to promote utilization of technology and exchange of business knowledge between Agoga and Ft. Lauderdale.
 Citrix primary involvement was in opening the Agogo Information and Communications Technology, offering Agoga residents access to computers, internet, and e-learning courses. In addition to the center, the Cyber City partnership has developed economic partnerships between Agoga and Ft. Lauderdale, including aquaculture and hydroponics projects.

Expanding partnerships 
In addition to funding programs for partnerships already in place, Sister Cities dedicates resources to encouraging partnerships in non-traditional areas in the Middle East and Africa. 
 Global Twinning Summit: Last year, Sister Cities held the first “Global Twinning Summit” in Cairo, to promote sister city relationships between Africa cities.
 African Regional Partners: African Regional Partners is made up of two associations: The Eastern Africa Sister Cities and the Africa Global Sister Cities foundation. Both work to build partnerships between U.S. and African cities.
 Muslim World Partnership Initiative: Since 2001, Sister Cities International has maintained a focus on increasing the number of partnerships with cities in predominately Muslim countries.

Annual conferences
Each summer, Sister Cities International holds a themed annual conference in a Sister City in America. SCI will be celebrating its 63rd anniversary in 2019 and will have a conference themed "Cities Mean Business" on July 17–19 in Houston, Texas.

History

Early years
Despite isolated community partnerships and informal citizen relations, the people-to-people initiative did not gain momentum until U.S. President Dwight D. Eisenhower's historic September 11–12, 1956 White House conference on citizen diplomacy. The post-World War II climate proved an ideal environment to launch this kind of effort.  With enthusiastic response to the concept, tens of thousands of Americans pledged their support to create a free and peaceful world.

Growing out of the two-day White House Conference, participants formed forty-two "People-to-People" committees.  The autonomous nature of the federally backed movement meant that some committees flourished while others never left the ground.  By 1960, thirty-three committees continued the original mission. People-to-People International also grew out of this umbrella group of committees.

The sister city idea developed from the Civic Committee.  Envisioned by President Eisenhower as the 'main cog' for citizen diplomacy, the sister city program grew throughout the 1950s and 1960s.  The Civic Committee and the National League of Cities provided joint administrative support for the fledgling sister city movement until 1973.

A 1974 study found that many early sister city relationships formed out of the post WWII aid programs to Western Europe. The relationships that endured, however, were based on cultural or educational reasons that developed lasting friendships.

During the mid-1960s, city affiliations recognized that their diverse efforts needed coordination.  In 1967, the Town Affiliation Association of the U.S. (already popularly known as Sister Cities International) was created.

Entering new territories
In 1979, the very first U.S. and People's Republic of China links were created. San Francisco made waves by forming a "friendship" relationship with Shanghai, China. Despite Cold War tensions, U.S. cities had already initiated sister city relationships with the Soviet Union in 1973.

Programs at that time focused on basic urban problems such as water and sanitation, health, housing, education and transportation.  Begun in 1977, the national Technical Assistance Program (TAP) worked to create training programs to increase employment, establish cooperatives and credit unions or to create appropriate small-scale industries. Development agencies realized that industrializing countries experienced the same urban problems as developed nations.  The sister city movement provided a mechanism for communities to share their experiences and growing pains. TAP focused on a spiral out benefits system.  For example, a city project to improve surface drainage would indirectly aid the urban poor. These citizens would gain better sanitation and possible employment from the project. The United States Agency for International Development (USAID) provided seed grant money for the project.

In the mid-1970s, the Town Affiliation Association began the School Affiliation Program.  Through this program, youth gained greater sensitivity toward other cultures and a broader global perspective.  In one program, Oakland, California and Fukuoka, Japan spent a school year exchanging artwork and conducting workshops on the Japanese culture.

Celebrating a 25th anniversary
The Town Affiliation Association marked its 25th anniversary in 1981. By that time, 720 U.S. cities representing 85 million citizens were linked to over 1,000 communities in 77 nations around the world. In addition, the association's name evolved to its current form, Sister Cities International.

During the 1980s, a focus on municipal twinning developed.  Mayors began to focus on relationships that offered technical assistance in municipal development. Similar to TAP, these exchanges worked on citywide issues such as solid waste management, urban planning, emergency response training and emergency management.

Cities also concentrated on international trade development. Building on their sister city relationships, participants developed economic interests with practical benefits.  In one joint venture, a Baltimore, Maryland business sent engines to a business in Xiamen, China. Factories in China used the engines in excavating equipment and forklift manufacturing. Despite ongoing debate on international trade, these cities took initiative and implemented durable business ventures at the grassroots level.

End of the Cold War and creating new ties
In September 1991, an unprecedented gathering of 220 Soviet officials and citizens arrived for the U.S.-Soviet Union Sister Cities conference.  Held in Cincinnati, Ohio, organizers noted this was the largest-ever gathering of Soviet citizens in the U.S.  With the Soviet Union's political and economic situation, delegates discussed developing local government, citizen involvement, education and the environment.  Trade and creating business ventures also featured importantly at the conference.  From there, the mayors visited their individual sister cities for five days.  The conference sought to encourage international understanding and communication among ordinary citizens. This event followed the failed August coup against President Mikhail Gorbachev and preceded the eventual independence of the Soviet Republics at the end of 1991.

Capitalizing on the growing world economy, many sister city members developed business agreements with their partners. Vermont's Ben and Jerry's Ice Cream company, for example, started a factory in Karelia, Russia. The company served 3,000 Russians a day and offered the same profit-sharing framework to its Russian employees as found in the American company. While not a primary goal, business relationships were a natural by-product of sister city exchanges.

During the mid-1990s many U.S. mayors conducted exploratory tours to countries in Asia, including India and Vietnam. The mayors addressed common urban issues; experienced the culture; facilitated economic opportunities; and promoted new sister city partnerships. The United States Information Agency (USIA) co-sponsored one trip with the Vietnam-U.S.A. Society as the sponsors in Vietnam.

The Internet offered another medium for communication. Through the introduction of email in 1993, Sonoma, California could communicate instantaneously with its sister city Kaniv, Ukraine.  

On June 4, 2022, Ukrainian President Volodymyr Zelenskyy spoke to the US Conference of Mayors.  Zelenskyy requested that cities in America take part in rebuilding Ukraine by developing ties between localities that can leverage resources allocated to the effort to repair damaged societal infrastructure.  Sister Cities in America have been delivering Humanitarian Aid to support Ukrainian people.  Poltava, Ukraine has been a Sister City of Irondequoit, NY since June 29,1992 due to an agreement signed by Anatonij Kukoba, then President of Poltava City Council, and Fredrick W. Lapple, then Town Supervisor of Irondequoit, NY.  The scope of the relationship is broadly defined in this document, agreeing that many sectors of public life are open for engagement.  After elected signatories process documents of this kind, agreements between Sister Cities are submitted to the main branch of SCI and kept on file at the Washington, DC office.  SCI's CEO has advocated for sustained relations between existing Sister Cities programs even in times of conflict.  

The Agreement between Irondequoit and Poltava states that their Sister City relationship never expires.  Former Irondequoit Supervisor Lapple formed a committee to locate a city willing to partner in the interest of honoring the Ukrainian community active in his town.  The relationship is ongoing, with a virtual conference occurring on July 14, 2022, featuring elected officials, organization leaders, and various citizens all given a venue to speak as the Ukrainians fight to secure their democracy.  This expression of citizen-to-citizen diplomacy has fostered participation in the international relations of multiple localities.  Sister Cities afford the opportunity for individual citizens to achieve global impact through efforts within their own local US communities. The SCI platform allows people to mobilize a network of international organizations, expanding participation in spheres driving democratic values, humanitarian relief, financial markets, and good governance organizations.  Irondequoit hosted Ukrainian delegates from Congress' Open World organization, supporting the development of leaders who embrace democratic values.  In an effort to inform the public for generations to come, the citizens from Irondequoit instituted a special collection of documents at the University of Rochester to historically preserve the more than one-hundred-year history of Ukrainian community in the greater Rochester area. 

In 1995, the U.S. House of Representatives passed legislation to eliminate the United States Information Agency (USIA) with vocal support from the U.S. Conference of Mayors International Affairs Committee and Sister City members. The broadcasting functions of the USIA were maintained by the now independent Broadcasting Board of Governors (BBG); all other continuing functions became part of the organizational structure overseen by the purposefully established Under Secretary of State for Public Diplomacy and Public Affairs within the United States Department of State (DoS). SCI is a leading member of a consortium of non-profit NGOs that partner with the DoS Bureau of Educational and Cultural Affairs (ECA), which was created as part of this new organizational structure.

Through the grant funding, logistical support and other resources made available through the ECA, SCI and other organizations develop, administer and promote the United States Cultural Exchange Programs (CEPs). One such CEP is the Kennedy-Lugar Youth Exchange and Study Programs (Yes Programs), which sponsor students predominantly from the Middle East to study for a year in the U.S. On a 2004 exchange, Arab students from Palestine, Jordan, Kuwait, Lebanon, Syria, Tunisia and Yemen lived in the U.S. for a year with host families and attended a leadership summit in Boulder, Colorado. To further the Yes Program's goals, Sister Cities International developed the Youth and Education Network in 2004.

See also
 Cross-border town naming
 List of local government organizations
 Lists of twin towns and sister cities
 Paradiplomacy
 Partnership2Gether
 Sister city
 Global city

References

External links
 Sister Cities International official website

International organizations based in the United States
Municipal international relations
Organizations established in 1956
1956 establishments in the United States
International charities